The Dixon Entrance is a strait about  long and wide in the Pacific Ocean at the Canada–United States border, between the U.S. state of Alaska and the province of British Columbia in Canada. The Dixon Entrance is part of the Inside Passage shipping route. It forms part of the maritime boundary between the U.S. and Canada, although the location of that boundary here is disputed.

Etymology
The strait was named by Joseph Banks for Captain George Dixon, a Royal Navy officer, maritime fur trader, and explorer, who surveyed the area in 1787.

Geography
The Dixon Entrance lies between Clarence Strait in the Alexander Archipelago in Alaska to the north, and Hecate Strait and the islands known as Haida Gwaii (the Queen Charlotte Islands) in British Columbia, to the south. Prince of Wales Island, Alaska, is the largest of the Alaskan islands on the north side of the entrance; the Kaigani Haida occupy this island. Members of the Haida nation maintain free access across the Strait.

Major inlets that empty into Dixon Entrance include Portland Inlet, Prince Rupert Harbour, and Masset Inlet.

Boundary dispute
The so-called "A–B" line (approximately 54°40'N), which marks the northern boundary of the Dixon Entrance, was delineated by a court of arbitration set up by the 1903 Alaska Boundary Treaty. The meaning of the line remains in dispute between Canada and the United States. Canada claims the line is the international maritime boundary, while the United States holds that its purpose was only to designate the land masses belonging to each country. Hence, the U.S. does not recognize the "A–B" line as an official boundary (to govern, for example, seafloor resources or fishing rights). In 1977 the U.S. defined a maritime boundary as an equidistant line between land masses.

The two differing boundary lines intersect to create four separate water areas with different claim status. The two areas south of the "A–B" line (about 2789 km2 and 51.5 km2 in size) are claimed by both countries.  The other two water areas are north of the "A–B" line and are not claimed by either country.  The two unclaimed areas are about 72 km2 and 1.4 km2 in size.

In addition, Nunez Rocks is a low-tide elevation (LTE) ("bare at half-tide") that lies south of the "A–B" Line, surrounded by the sea territory claimed by the U.S. The United States has not ratified the Law of the Sea Treaty, although it adheres to most of its principles as customary international law. Under the treaty, LTEs may be used as basepoints for a territorial sea, and the U.S. uses Nunez Rocks as a basepoint. As a non-signatory, however, there is nothing preventing the U.S. from claiming areas beyond the scope of the Law of the Sea Treaty. The fact remains that, for about half of each day, above-water territory that Canada regards as Canadian is surrounded by sea territory that the U.S. has declared to be American.

Territorial fishing disputes between the countries remain today, as the United States has never shown the "A–B" line as an official boundary on its government maps.

See also 
 Alaska boundary dispute
 List of areas disputed by the United States and Canada

References

Disputed waters
Canada–United States border disputes
Straits of Canada
Straits of Alaska
North Coast of British Columbia
Straits of Prince of Wales–Hyder Census Area, Alaska
Bodies of water of Ketchikan Gateway Borough, Alaska
International straits